Edwin Wilson may refer to:

 B. Edwin Wilson, retired United States Air Force general
 Edwin Bidwell Wilson (1879–1964), American mathematician
 Edwin H. Wilson (1898–1993), American Unitarian and humanist leader
 Edwin P. Wilson (1928–2012), American intelligence official and CIA officer
 Edwin Wilson (academic) (born 1923), Provost Emeritus, Wake Forest University
 Edwin Wilson (theater critic) (born 1927), theater critic for The Wall Street Journal
 Edwin Wilson (poet) (born 1942), Australian poet and painter
 Edwin Lionel Wilson (1861–1951), Australian football administrator
 Edwin Osbourne Wilson, former concert promoter in Texas

See also
 Eddie Wilson (disambiguation)
 Edmund Wilson (disambiguation)
 Edward Wilson (disambiguation)